Freidel is a surname. Notable people with the surname include:

 David Freidel (born 1946), American archaeologist
 Frank Freidel (1916–1993), American historian
 Laurent Freidel, French physicist

See also
 Friedel